Remi Kabaka Jr. (born 11 April 1970) is a British record producer, art director, percussionist and voice actor best known as the drummer and producer for British virtual band Gorillaz. He became a music producer for the band in 2015 after several years of providing the voice of Russel Hobbs and was listed as an A&R producer alongside Damon Albarn and Jamie Hewlett in the 2019 documentary Gorillaz: Reject False Icons. In 2007, Kabaka created the audiovisual collective Gorillaz Sound System.

Career
Along with his work with Gorillaz, Kabaka has collaborated further with the band's frontman Damon Albarn and artist Jamie Hewlett on other projects including DRC, Africa Express and Bobby Womack's album The Bravest Man in the Universe.

Kabaka is also a manager of Steve Lazarides's London art gallery, which regularly exhibits work by the artist Banksy.

Personal life
Kabaka lives in London and is in a long-term relationship with Ciorsdan.

References

External links 
 
 

1970 births
Living people
Black British musicians
British people of Nigerian descent
British record producers
Gorillaz members
Parlophone artists
Warner Records artists
Virgin Records artists